Libor Pimek and Byron Talbot were the defending champions but only Pimek competed that year with Menno Oosting.

Oosting and Pimek lost in the semifinals to Andrei Olhovskiy and Brett Steven.

Olhovskiy and Steven won in the final 6–4, 6–2 against Kenneth Carlsen and Frederik Fetterlein.

Seeds

  Menno Oosting /  Libor Pimek (semifinals)
  Tomás Carbonell /  Francisco Roig (quarterfinals)
  David Adams /  Marius Barnard (first round)
  Pablo Albano /  Peter Nyborg (first round)

Draw

External links
 1997 Copenhagen Open Doubles draw

1997 Copenhagen Open – 2
1997 ATP Tour